Eugeniusz Kwiatkowski (30 December 1888, Kraków – 22 August 1974, Kraków) was a Polish politician and economist, Deputy Prime Minister of Poland, government minister and manager of the Second Polish Republic.

Biography 
He studied at the prestigious Jesuit college in Chyrów, and then graduated chemistry at the University of Lwów and Ludwig Maximilian University of Munich.

After Józef Piłsudski's May coup d'état of 1926 in the Second Polish Republic, he was recommended by president Ignacy Mościcki for the post Minister of Industry and Trade in the government of Kazimierz Bartel. Kwiatkowski was a minister in eight successive governments (1926–30) and Deputy Prime Minister of Poland and Minister of Finance of Poland in two governments (1935–39).

Among the most famous achievements of Kwiatkowski are the giant construction projects: the construction of Gdynia seaport, the development of the Polish Merchant Navy and sea trade, and the creation of Centralny Okręg Przemysłowy (The Central Industrial Region).

After the Soviet Union joined Nazi Germany in the invasion of Poland in 1939, he evacuated Poland with the rest of the Government on 17 September. He was interned in Romania until 1945. He returned to Poland and supervised the projects of reconstruction of the Polish seacoast, and in the years 1947–1952, he was a deputy to the Polish parliament (Sejm).

With the strengthening of the communist and Soviet grip on the Polish government, which he opposed, he fell out of favour of the communist government of the Polish People's Republic and was forced to retire in 1948. From 1952 onward, he concentrated on studies of chemistry, physics, and history.

He died in Kraków on 22 August 1974.

Works 
 Zagadnienie przemysłu chemicznego na tle wielkiej wojny (1923)
 Postęp gospodarczy Polski (Economic Progress of Poland) (1928)
 Polska gospodarcza w roku 1928 (Economic Poland in 1928) (1928)
 Powrót Polski nad Bałtyk (The Return of Poland to Baltic) (1930)
 Dysproporcje. Rzecz o Polsce przeszłej i obecnej (1932)
 "Rzecz najważniejsza Polska" - Wybór myśli politycznych i społecznych (1988) - selection of his papers

See also
 List of Poles

Bibliography
 Janusz Zaręba, Eugeniusz Kwiatkowski - romantyczny pragmatyk, Centrum Edukacji i Rozwoju Biznesu. Instytut Naukowo-Wydawniczy, Warszawa, 1998
 Archiwum polityczne Eugeniusza Kwiatkowskiego, Wydawnictwo Sejmowe, Warszawa, 2002
 Marian Marek Drozdowski, Eugeniusz Kwiatkowski, Zakład Narodowy im. Ossolińskich - Wydawnictwo, Wrocław, 2001
 Marian Marek Drozdowski, Eugeniusz Kwiatkowski w polskiej historiografii i publicystyce historyczno-ekonomicznej, Instytut Historii Polskiej Akademii Nauk, Warszawa, 1992
 Marian Marek Drozdowski, Eugeniusz Kwiatkowski : człowiek i dzieło, Wydawnictwo Literackie, Kraków, 1989
 Marian Marek Drozdowski, Piotr Dwojacki, Archiwum Morskie Eugeniusza Kwiatkowskiego, E. Kwiatkowski University of Business and Administration, Gdynia, 2009

References

1888 births
1974 deaths
Politicians from Kraków
People from the Kingdom of Galicia and Lodomeria
Sanacja politicians
Deputy Prime Ministers of Poland
Finance Ministers of Poland
Government ministers of Poland
Members of the Polish Sejm 1947–1952
Polish Rifle Squads members
Polish Military Organisation members
Association of the Polish Youth "Zet" members
Polish legionnaires (World War I)
Polish Austro-Hungarians
Polish economists
Lviv Polytechnic alumni
Academic staff of the Warsaw University of Technology
Grand Crosses of the Order of Polonia Restituta
Commanders with Star of the Order of Polonia Restituta
Commanders of the Order of Polonia Restituta
Grand Officiers of the Légion d'honneur
Grand Crosses of the Order of the Star of Romania
Grand Crosses of the Order of St. Sava
Commanders Grand Cross of the Order of the Polar Star
Order of Saint Olav
Grand Crosses of the Order of the White Lion
Grand Crosses of the Order of the Phoenix (Greece)
Grand Crosses of the Order of the Crown (Belgium)
Burials at Rakowicki Cemetery
Recipients of the Order of the White Eagle (Poland)